William E. Schroeder was an American football coach.  He was the head football coach at Bethel College in North Newton, Kansas, serving for three seasons, from 1914 to 1916, and compiling a record of 1–6.

Head coaching record

References

Year of birth missing
Year of death missing
Bethel Threshers football coaches